Ernest Hawełek (born 28 January 1935) is a Polish gymnast. He competed in eight events at the 1960 Summer Olympics.

References

1935 births
Living people
Polish male artistic gymnasts
Olympic gymnasts of Poland
Gymnasts at the 1960 Summer Olympics
People from Wodzisław County
Sportspeople from Silesian Voivodeship